Marguerite Sayers BE CEng FIEI serves as Executive Director for Customer Solutions  of ESB. She is the President for Engineers Ireland (EI) for 2019. She is also a Fellow of EI.

Biography 

Marguerite Sayers was born c 1970 and grew up near Tralee, County Kerry. graduated from University College Cork with a degree in Electrical and Electronic Engineering in 1991. She went one to get diplomas in Accounting and Finance from University of Limerick and in Project Management from her alma mater, UCC. She has worked for ESB since she graduated and before this role she was Managing Director, ESB Networks in Ireland. She is a chartered engineer and a fellow of Engineers Ireland. Since May 2018 Sayers has been the Executive Director for Customer Solutions. Sayers spent seven years involved in the executive committee and other councils of Engineers Ireland. In May 2019 she became the 127th president of Engineers Ireland. She is only the 4th woman to hold this position. Sayers is also a member of the National Pediatric Hospital development board.

See also 

 ESB Group
 Engineers Ireland

References

External links 
 Profile on Bloomberg

Living people
Alumni of University College Cork
Year of birth missing (living people)
Alumni of the University of Limerick
Irish women engineers
21st-century women engineers